The Tribute Cornwall/Devon League 2011–12 was the 25th full season of rugby union within the Cornwall/Devon League and consisted of eight teams from Devon and six teams from Cornwall. Tavistock as champions and Honiton as runners–up were promoted to the Tribute Western Counties West for season 2012–13, whilst Veor was relegated to Tribute Cornwall One, and Totnes and Torrington were relegated to Tribute Devon One for season 2012–13.

Table

See also
 English rugby union system

References

Cornwall1
Tribute Cornwall/Devon